Royal York Collegiate Institute (Royal York CI, RYCI, or Royal York) is a former public high school existed from 1953–1982 under the Etobicoke Board of Education (now known as the Toronto District School Board) in The Queensway – Humber Bay neighbourhood of the Etobicoke district in Toronto, Ontario, Canada. It was the first academic high school built in Etobicoke after World War II.

History
Royal York C.I. was constructed in 1952 and opened on September 8, 1953. The school was designed by architect Gordon Adamson. The auditorium was later erected in 1957.

It had an active sports program and many championship wins over the years. The girls' Jr. volleyball team won the Borough of Etobicoke Girls' Interschool Volleyball Championship on February 21, 1968.

With declining enrollment, Royal York Collegiate Institute, along with New Toronto Secondary School (later Lakeshore Collegiate Institute), Kingsmill Secondary School (later Bishop Allen Academy), and Alderwood Collegiate Institute underwent a review in 1980 as many Catholic immigrants who arrived in the area transferred their children to the separate school system when full separate school funding commenced. As a consequence, Royal York Collegiate closed in June 1982. The building was then occupied by Etobicoke School of the Arts in 1983.

The school's colours were purple and gold. Royal York C.I.'s motto is "Cum Aliis, Pro Aliis" which translates to With others, for others.

Notable alumni
Tom Anselmi, Canadian sports executive
Grant Frame, Assyriologist, Professor Emeritus of the University of Pennsylvania, and Curator Emeritus of the Babylonian Section of the Penn Museum

See also
List of high schools in Ontario
Etobicoke School of the Arts

References

External links
Royal York Collegiate Institute
Etobicoke School of the Arts

High schools in Toronto
Schools in the TDSB
Educational institutions established in 1953
Educational institutions disestablished in 1982
1953 establishments in Ontario
Education in Etobicoke